Benjamin Scott Holmstrom (born April 9, 1987) is an American professional ice hockey center who is currently an unrestricted free agent. He most recently played with the Rochester Americans in the American Hockey League (AHL).  He previously captained the Bridgeport Sound Tigers in the American Hockey League (AHL). His brother Josh Holmstrom was a teammate with the Sound Tigers.

Playing career
Undrafted, Holmstrom signed a two-year entry level contract with the Philadelphia Flyers on March 17, 2010 after playing four seasons of collegiate hockey with UMass Lowell. Holmstrom was called up on March 3, 2011 and made his NHL debut against the Toronto Maple Leafs.

On July 3, 2014, Holmstrom left the Flyers organization after four years to sign a free agent contract with the Carolina Hurricanes. Holmstrom was assigned to AHL affiliate, the Charlotte Checkers for the duration of the 2014–15 season, contributing with 20 points in 62 games, as the Checkers missed the post-season.

On July 2, 2015, Holmstrom signed as a free agent to a one-year, two-way contract with the New York Islanders. After two seasons under contract with the Islanders, Holmstrom opted to continue within the organization in signing for his third season with the Bridgeport Sound Tigers on an AHL deal on October 4, 2017.

After leading the Sound Tigers for four seasons, Holmstrom left the club as a free agent at the conclusion of the 2018–19 season. On August 27, 2019, Holmstrom agreed to continue his career, signing a one-year contract with the Norfolk Admirals of the ECHL. During the 2019–20 season after collecting 19 points in 42 games, Holmstrom was traded by the Admirals to the Cincinnati Cyclones.

As a free agent in the off-season, Holmstrom approaching his 12th professional season opted to sign abroad by agreeing to a one-year contract with Norwegian club, Lillehammer IK of the Eliteserien on June 16, 2020. In his lone season in Norway in 2020–21, Holmstrom added a scoring presence to the Lillehammer forward group, adding 6 goals and 19 points in 23 regular season games.

Holmstrom opted to return to North America following the season, agreeing to continue his career in the ECHL with the South Carolina Stingrays on August 13, 2021. After 38 games with the Stingrays, Holmstrom was signed to a professional tryout contract in a return to the AHL with the Rochester Americans. On April 6, 2022, Holmstrom was given an 8 game suspension for using a homophobic slur against another player in a game against the Utica Comets on March 30.

Career statistics

Awards and honors

References

External links
 

1987 births
Living people
Adirondack Phantoms players
American men's ice hockey centers
American people of Swedish descent
Bridgeport Sound Tigers players
Charlotte Checkers (2010–) players
Cincinnati Cyclones (ECHL) players
Ice hockey players from Colorado
Lillehammer IK players
Norfolk Admirals (ECHL) players
Philadelphia Flyers players
Rochester Americans players
Sioux Falls Stampede players
South Carolina Stingrays players
Sportspeople from Colorado Springs, Colorado
UMass Lowell River Hawks men's ice hockey players
Undrafted National Hockey League players